Football Club Cincinnati, commonly known as FC Cincinnati, is an American professional soccer club based in Cincinnati. The club plays in the Eastern Conference of Major League Soccer (MLS). The team succeeded the lower-division team of the same name and was announced on May 29, 2018, when MLS awarded an expansion franchise to Cincinnati. The team began MLS play on March 2, 2019, with its first match against Seattle Sounders FC. The club's ownership group is led by Carl H. Lindner III with Jeff Berding serving as Co-CEO. Currently, the role of general manager is held by Chris Albright.

History
The owners of the USL club began negotiations with Major League Soccer over a potential expansion franchise in early 2016, and Cincinnati was announced as one of ten cities that had expressed interest in the slots for teams 25 to 28. MLS Commissioner Don Garber visited Cincinnati in December 2016 to tour Nippert Stadium and meet with city and club officials, complimenting the city and its fans. FC Cincinnati formally submitted its expansion bid in January 2017, including a shortlist of potential stadium locations.

On May 29, 2018, Major League Soccer announced that Cincinnati would join the league in 2019 as an expansion team under the FC Cincinnati brand. TQL Stadium, a 26,000-seat soccer-specific venue in the West End, opened in 2021.

FC Cincinnati signed its first two MLS players, Fanendo Adi and Fatai Alashe, in July 2018. Adi was the team's first Designated Player. Both players were loaned to the FC Cincinnati USL team for the remainder of the 2018 season.

FC Cincinnati selected five players from certain MLS teams in the expansion draft, which took place on December 11, 2018. The players were Darren Mattocks (D.C United), Kei Kamara (Vancouver Whitecaps FC), Roland Lamah (FC Dallas), Eric Alexander (Houston Dynamo), and Hassan Ndam (New York Red Bulls). Kei Kamara was then traded to the Colorado Rapids for an international roster spot.

On May 7, 2019, the club fired head coach Alan Koch after a 2–7–2 start to the 2019 MLS season. Assistant coach Yoann Damet was named as interim head coach. President and general manager Jeff Berding cited a culmination of on-field performance and off-field matters for the dismissal. On August 8, 2019, Ron Jans was officially hired and made head coach of FC Cincinnati. However, Jans resigned on February 17, 2020, amidst an investigation into his alleged use of a racial slur.

On August 6, 2021, FC Cincinnati announced that the club and then general manager Gerard Nijkamp had "parted ways effective immediately". On September 27, 2021, the club relieved the duties of head coach Jaap Stam, 2-time interim head coach Yoann Damet, and assistant coach Said Bakkati. Former MLS defender Tyrone Marshall was named interim coach.

On October 4, 2021, FC Cincinnati announced the hiring of Chris Albright as the general manager of the club. On December 14, 2021, FC Cincinnati officially hired Pat Noonan as the new head coach of the team. Under the first season of the Albright-Noonan regime, the Orange and Blue would qualify for their first post-season in 2022 on 49 points (12–9–13), good for fifth in the East (eighth in the league). Brenner and Brandon Vazquez would score a joint-best 18 goals in the regular season, the first time in MLS history teammates had made such a mark; in addition, Luciano Acosta contributed 10 goals and a league-leading 19 assists to a Cincinnati side that netted 64 goals on the season. Cincinnati defeated New York Red Bulls in their first playoff match (2–1) before losing to top-seeded Philadelphia Union in the conference semifinals, 1–0.

Stadium 
FC Cincinnati played at Nippert Stadium for its first two seasons in MLS while its permanent home, the soccer-specific TQL Stadium, was being built. The new stadium hosted its first match, a 3–2 loss to Inter Miami CF, on May 16, 2021.

Colors and badge 
FC Cincinnati's primary colors are orange and blue. The secondary colors are gray, dark blue, and white.

An updated crest was designed after they were accepted as an expansion team to Major League Soccer. It maintains the same orange and blue color scheme but now pays tribute to the city of Cincinnati.

Sponsorship 

FC Cincinnati reached a multiyear deal with First Financial Bank to serve as the club's exclusive banking and financial services partner. First Financial will gain many benefits from this partnership. There will be a First Financial Gate as well as a premium club area at the new stadium. They will also be involved in planning community events, fan experiences and game-day activities. As part of an extended sponsorship, First Financial Bank was announced as FC Cincinnati's sleeve sponsor, along with Cintas.

Club culture 

The club recognizes the following supporters' groups: Auxilia One, the Briogaid, The 5th Line, Die Innenstadt, Hangar 937, Norden, The Pride, Queen City Firm, and the Queen City Mafia. All of these supporter groups are together under a unified organizing body named 'The Incline Collective', which is responsible for pooling resources for community events, Tifos, organizing 'The March', and organizing with the club.

Starting as a tradition when the club was in USL, The March, as the name would imply, is a march to the stadium from various bars and points of interest throughout Over The Rhine in Cincinnati. As of February 2023, the current iteration of The March consists of stopping at the breweries and bars, Northern Row, OTR Stillhouse, Holiday Spirits, Taft's Ale House, The Symphony Hotel, and The Pitch to have the respective supporters groups join The March. 3/4ths of the way through The March, supporters stop at Washington Park for a rally before the final leg of entering TQL Stadium.

Rivalries 

Cincinnati has an in-state rival in Columbus Crew. The idea of the Ohio soccer rivalry first gained popularity ahead of a 2017 U.S. Open Cup match between FC Cincinnati (then in the United Soccer League) and the Crew. The rivalry was dubbed the Hell Is Real Derby after a billboard on Interstate 71, the highway between Columbus and Cincinnati. The clubs faced each other in their first league matches in 2019: on August 10 in Columbus and August 25 in Cincinnati (the latter match took place during MLS Rivalry Week).

FCC also retains a heated rivalry from its USL days with current lower division club Louisville. The two teams most recently played each other in a friendly on March 13, 2021.

Ownership 

Former Cincinnati Bengals executive Jeff Berding was the club's original president, and in 2022, he was promoted to co-CEO. The CEO and majority owner of the team is Carl Lindner III, CEO of American Financial Group, with Scott Farmer also a leading owner.

In November 2019, Meg Whitman purchased a minority stake in the club. Whitman will serve as the club's Alternate Governor on the MLS Board of Governors.

In May 2019, Dutch football executive Gerard Nijkamp joined the club as general manager to oversee all the club's sports activities. On August 6, 2021, Nijkamp and the club mutually agreed to part ways. The club was 7–20–10 during his tenure.

Media 

On January 30, 2019, FC Cincinnati reached an agreement with Sinclair Broadcast Group to have WSTR-TV televise all home and away games, except for ones already scheduled to be broadcast nationally. Continuing from their roles on the former USL team, Tom Gelehrter would call play-by-play with Kevin McCloskey as color analyst. Lindsay Patterson served as sideline reporter through 2019, and Alex Stec held the position from 2020.

From 2023, all FC Cincinnati matches are available on MLS Season Pass from Apple TV, ending FC Cincinnati's time on local TV.

Players and staff

Roster

Out on loan

Technical staff 

{| class="wikitable sortable"
|-
!scope="col" style="background:#003087;color:#FFFFFF;border:2px solid #FE5000"| Title
!scope="col" style="background:#003087;color:#FFFFFF;border:2px solid #FE5000"| Name
|-

Head coaches

Club captains

Records

Year-by-year

This is a partial list of the last five MLS seasons completed by FC Cincinnati. For the full season-by-season history, see List of FC Cincinnati seasons.

1. Avg. attendance include statistics from league matches only.
2. Top goalscorer(s) includes all goals scored in League, Playoffs, U.S. Open Cup, MLS is Back Tournament, CONCACAF Champions League, FIFA Club World Cup, and other competitive continental matches.

Player records

Appearances

Goals

Shutouts 
 

 
Bolded players are currently on the FC Cincinnati roster.

Affiliated clubs 
On September 25, 2020, FC Cincinnati signed a partnership agreement with Bundesliga club TSG 1899 Hoffenheim. Furthermore, the club is also a part of the "Common Values Club Alliance" with Hoffenheim, and Ghanaian Premier League club Hearts of Oak SC.

Footnotes

References

External links

FC Cincinnati
Association football clubs established in 2018
2018 establishments in Ohio
FC Cincinnati
Soccer clubs in Ohio
Major League Soccer teams
Lindner family